Ahmed Fouad Alkhatib is an American humanitarian activist and blogger. He is the founder and executive director of Project Unified Assistance, a nonprofit organization working towards the establishment of a humanitarian airport in the Gaza Strip, to be run and operated by the United Nations.

Background

Alkhatib's family is originally from the Gaza Strip. He and his family returned there from Saudi Arabia, where his father worked as a physician, in 2000.

Alkhatib left Gaza in 2005, at the age of 15, for a one-year-long U.S. Department of State-sponsored cultural exchange program. Upon completing the program, Alkhatib attempted to return to Gaza via Egypt but was unable to do so. The abduction of an Israeli soldier had resulted in the closure of the Rafah border between Gaza and Egypt. Alkhatib remained in Egypt for months without being able to enter Gaza. He applied for and received political asylum in the U.S., where he studied marketing and became interested in social entrepreneurship. He became a U.S. citizen in 2014.

Project Unified Assistance

Alkhatib has had a lifelong interest in aviation and desire to work in the field, especially during the time when Gaza's international airport was operational. After the destruction of the Gaza airport during the Second Intifada, he was convinced of the need "to play a role in restoring aviation services to the people of Gaza." Project Unified Assistance represents the culmination of Alkhatib's interests in aviation, social entrepreneurship, and desire to help the Palestinian population living in Gaza.

2017 Ben Gurion Airport incident

In 2017, while attempting to visit his sister and parents in Israel, Alkhatib was deported from Ben Gurion airport. Although he is a naturalized U.S. citizen and had not traveled to Palestinian territories for over a decade, Israeli authorities claimed that he was a Palestinian with "active citizenship." Later, Alkhatib published details about what took place during the deportation in an op-ed in The Jerusalem Post.

References

External links
 Alkhatib to Mladenov: The airport is a core and real issue in Gaza
 Liberman's airport comment not so ridiculous, says Gaza activist
 AN AIRPORT IN GAZA, FOR THE BENEFIT OF ALL
 An Israeli Airstrike on Gaza Nearly Killed Me. But I Recognize Both Sides' Trauma

American people of Palestinian descent
Palestinian activists
Activists from the San Francisco Bay Area